Medicago praecox, Mediterranean medick or early medick, is a plant species of the genus Medicago. It is found throughout the northern Mediterranean. It forms a symbiotic relationship with the bacterium Sinorhizobium meliloti, which is capable of nitrogen fixation.

References

External links
 International Legume Database & Information Services

praecox